Darryl Swann (born October 25, 1965) is an American record producer, songwriter, educator and musician. Triple platinum award winner.  He has worked with prominent artists including, John Frusciante, Macy Gray, The Black Eyed Peas, Greg Hetson, Mos Def, and Ryatt, among others.  He has also done substantial work for Atlantic Records, Sony Records, and Universal Records.

Early Years (1965-1984)
Darryl Swann was born and raised in the Cleveland, Ohio suburb of Shaker Heights. Darryl's fascination with music production began at age 9 upon reading the book Modern Recording Techniques. He played lead guitar in the garage band "The Lab Rats" and mixed live sound for many Cleveland area bands throughout his teenage years. After graduating from Shaker Heights High School in 1983, Swann acquired his Liberal Arts degree from UCLA in  Westwood, Los Angeles, California. In 1984, Darryl and his new rock band "Haven" relocated to Los Angeles and played with Poison and Warrant at The Troubadour.

Musical career

As an Artist
Haven's success led to a trip to London, England, and a subsequent tour of Europe to promote Haven’s independent E.P. album. Since that time, Swann has played guitar on numerous records for artists such as

As a Producer

Senova Media
Swann, who is a longtime contributor to ASCAP, is a writer, record producer, and developer of emerging artists under his own production company Senova Media. As both a composer and songwriter, Swann and Senova Media have many film and TV credits.  As a result of Swann's understanding of both orchestral composition and contemporary music styles, in 2007, Swann was commissioned to compose and produce the orchestral tributes to The Used and Cradle of Filth, titled Strung Out on The Used: The String Quartet Tribute and Scorched Earth Orchestra Plays Cradle of Filth: The Orchestra Tribute, which were both released on Vitamin Records. Swann also produced a Prince tribute album which was recorded with children's toy musical instruments which Vitamin never released.

Producing Macy Gray

As an Educator
Swann teaches a music production curriculum through several notable schools, among them are Musicians Institute, The Art Institute of California - Hollywood and UCLA. His music has been on television shows including MTV's True Life program, NBC's Las Vegas, ESPN's Extreme 16 & Core Culture, and in commercials for Pepsi / Mountain Dew, Honda, So You Think You Can Dance, Motorola's Razor phone and the Apple iPhone.

References

External links

1965 births
Living people
Record producers from Ohio
American music educators
Musicians from Cleveland
Educators from Ohio